BON, Bon, or bon may refer to:

Places:
 Bon, Amur Oblast, Russia
 Cap Bon, a peninsula in Tunisia
 Bon, Iran (disambiguation), places in Iran

People:
Bon (surname)
 Bhakti Hridaya Bon (Swami Bon), Hindu guru
Bon Scott, Australian singer-songwriter

Religion:
 Bon or Bön, a Tibetan religious tradition
 Bon Lamaism, the religion tradition of Tamang people.
 Bon Festival, Japanese Buddhist holiday to honor the spirits of deceased ancestors

Computing:
 Business Object Notation, notation for high-level object-oriented analysis

Transportation:
 Bolton Interchange, Greater Manchester, England (National Rail station code BON)
 Flamingo International Airport, Bonaire, Netherlands Antilles (IATA code BON)
 North Station, Boston (Amtrak station code BON)

Other:
 Band Ohne Namen (B.O.N.), German music group
 Bon (finance), a type of paper currency used in the 19th century
 The Bon Marché, a famous department store in Seattle also known as The Bon
 Bon Ice, Latin American liquid candy product
 Bisphosphonate-associated osteonecrosis of the jaw, aka BON of the jaw
 Bankon language, also known as Bon, Abo, Abaw, Bo
 Blue Ocean Network, an English-language television news channel based in China

See also
 Bøn, village in Norway
 Bonn, Cologne/Bonn Region, Germany
 Bonn (disambiguation)
 Le Bon (disambiguation)
 Bon Accord (disambiguation)
 Boen (disambiguation)